The St. James Centre, later re-branded as St. James Shopping, was a shopping centre next to the former New St. Andrew House office building for the Scottish Office, in Edinburgh, Scotland. It was initially designed by Burke Martin Partnership in 1964 but was completed by architects Ian G Cooke and Hugh Martin of Hugh Martin & Partners after Martin's partnership with Ian Burke ceased in 1969.

The Brutalist architecture of the government offices, atop the shopping centre, made it one of Edinburgh's most unloved buildings, but the shopping centre was a popular and busy shopping location. All of the shops in the centre, with the exception of the John Lewis department store, closed in 2016 in preparation for demolition, which has since commenced; work on extensions to John Lewis has also begun.

The centre had over 60 stores, cafés, restaurants and a food court. In the 2010s, it boasted many popular stores such as River Island, Burton, Wallis, Next, Sports Direct, JD Sports, Subway, Game and Dorothy Perkins.

Redevelopment

An £850m redevelopment of the former shopping centre, New St. Andrew's House office and hotel by its owners, Nuveen Real Estate, is currently under construction. The existing 1973 building has been completely demolished to make way for a three-storey, glass-roofed, crescent-shaped building designed by Allan Murray Architects. Edinburgh City Council planners gave the plans approval in July 2015 despite objections from conservation groups concerned about the possible impact on the city's World Heritage status.

Construction work was expected to start in 2015 and it was anticipated the retail elements would be completed by late 2016, but the start of demolition was delayed with all shops in the existing centre continuing to trade in January 2016.  In November 2015 it was reported that the centre would close in late 2016 and that an agreement had been reached with the John Lewis, with the store remain open throughout work on the scheme and a refurbished department store as part of the finished St James development.

On 15 October 2016, the Edinburgh Evening News reported that the St James Centre would close its doors on 16 October 2016, with demolition work to begin within weeks.

The new St James Quarter (initially named Edinburgh St James) replacement was due to be completed by 2020, with the hotel opening in 2021. The replacement opened in its first phase in June 2021, with additional stores and a cinema opening into 2022. The hotels are due to open later in 2023, due to small delays in its construction as a result of the coronavirus pandemic.

References

External links

Edinburgh St James development

Shopping centres in Edinburgh
2016 disestablishments in Scotland
Defunct shopping malls